José Marco "Zé Marco" Nóbrega Ferreira de Melo (born March 19, 1971 in João Pessoa, Paraíba) is a beach volleyball player from Brazil, who won the silver medal in the men's beach team competition at the 2000 Summer Olympics in Sydney, Australia, partnering Ricardo Santos. He also represented his native country at the 1996 Summer Olympics in Atlanta, Georgia.

References

External links
 
 
 
 

1971 births
Living people
Brazilian men's beach volleyball players
Beach volleyball players at the 1996 Summer Olympics
Beach volleyball players at the 2000 Summer Olympics
Olympic beach volleyball players of Brazil
Olympic silver medalists for Brazil
Olympic medalists in beach volleyball
Medalists at the 2000 Summer Olympics
People from João Pessoa, Paraíba
Volleyball players from Rio de Janeiro (city)
Portuguese people of Brazilian descent
Brazilian people of Portuguese descent
Brazilian people of Spanish descent